Creagan Bridge is a bridge that crosses Loch Creran at Creagan in Scotland. It is a road bridge that uses the supporting columns of a former railway viaduct.

The railway viaduct was opened on 21 August 1903 by the Callander and Oban Railway. It carried the branch line to Ballachulish and was situated approximately half a mile from Creagan railway station. It closed with the line on 28 March 1966. A road bridge reusing the supporting columns of the railway viaduct was opened in 1999.

References 

Road bridges in Scotland
Railway bridges in Scotland
Bridges completed in 1903